São Mamede de Infesta, or simply São Mamede, is a former civil parish in the municipality of Matosinhos in the Greater Porto area, Portugal. In 2013, the parish merged into the new parish São Mamede de Infesta e Senhora da Hora. It has a population of approximately 28,000 inhabitants and is located just north of the city of Porto.

References

Cities in Portugal
Former parishes of Matosinhos